Mohammed Brian Iman Abdullah Bothwell is a former professional footballer most known for leading
Brunei FA to their first Malaysian Cup title in 1999. He won the Penang Sports Club International Soccer Sevens tournament in 2007 with the Brunei Dragons.

Career

Brunei

Spending several seasons in Australia, Bothwell returned to his native Scotland after being invited to train with Celtic. Instead, however, he passed on the opportunity to become an apprentice at Sheffield United. Next, the Scottish-born forward went back to Australia before transferring to Brunei FA, earning 50,000 pounds a year. In 2003, the Football Association of Malaysia ratified a policy which stated that foreign players must ply their trade elsewhere for two years before they can return to Malaysia. Despite this, they still allowed Bothwell to play for Brunei at the time without playing abroad for two years. By 2004, Bothwell had left the team.

Geylang

While lining up for Geylang from 2000 to 2002, the Australian was accused of match-fixing along with footballers William Bone, Max Nicholson and Lutz Pfannenstiel. He was released on a 5775  pound bail after being catechized by the police regarding the incident. Brian was cleared of any involvement in match fixing and went on to win the league title the following season.

Retiring in 2004, the former footballer opted to become a coach, getting his AFC B License and AFC Level 1 Goalkeeping license.
He last coached Geylang's Under-18 side.

Personal life

In order to marry Malaysian Salwani Abdul Rahman Sahib, Bothwell converted to Islam. Their wedding was broadcast live on television. Later, he married a Singaporean.

As a child, he was a supporter of Scottish club Celtic.

During his time in Australia, Bothwell lived with his parents Margaret and Brian who moved there as well.

References

External links
 Brian Bothwell at Aussie Footballers

Association football forwards
Living people
1970 births
Expatriate footballers in Brunei
Australian soccer players
Australian expatriate soccer players
National Soccer League (Australia) players
Singapore Premier League players
Geylang International FC players
Scottish emigrants to Australia
Expatriate footballers in Singapore
Malaysia Premier League players
Gippsland Falcons players
Brunei (Malaysia Premier League team) players